Alias Mary Brown is a 1918 American silent crime film directed by Henri D'Elba and starring Pauline Starke, Casson Ferguson and Arthur Millett.

Cast
 Pauline Starke as Betty 
 Casson Ferguson as Dick Browning, aka Mary Brown 
 Arthur Millett as Hewlett 
 Eugene Burr as Watson 
 Sidney De Gray as Carnac 
 Walter Belasco as Uncle Ike 
 F. Thompson  as Gunter 
 Richard Rosson as Weasel 
 Alberta Lee as Mrs. Browning

References

Bibliography
 Ken Wlaschin. Silent Mystery and Detective Movies: A Comprehensive Filmography. McFarland, 2009.

External links
 

1918 films
1918 crime films
American silent feature films
American crime films
American black-and-white films
Triangle Film Corporation films
1910s English-language films
1910s American films
English-language crime films